The men's 100 metres event at the 2017 Summer Universiade was held on 23 and 24 August at the Taipei Municipal Stadium.

Medalists

Results

Heats
Qualification: First 3 in each heat (Q) and next 2 fastest (q) qualified for the quarterfinals.

Wind:Heat 1: +0.1 m/s, Heat 2: -0.4 m/s, Heat 3: +0.3 m/s, Heat 4: -1.3 m/s, Heat 5: -0.1 m/sHeat 6: -0.1 m/s, Heat 7: -0.7 m/s, Heat 8: +1.1 m/s, Heat 9: +1.4 m/s, Heat 10: -0.9 m/s

Quarterfinals
Qualification: First 3 in each heat (Q) and the next 4 fastest (q) qualified for the semifinals.

Wind:Heat 1: +0.4 m/s, Heat 2: -0.4 m/s, Heat 3: 0.0 m/s, Heat 4: -0.1 m/s

Semifinals
Qualification: First 4 in each heat (Q) qualified for the final.

Wind:Heat 1: 0.0 m/s, Heat 2: +0.1 m/s

Final

Wind: -0.9 m/s

References

2017
2017